ZG80 is a 2016 Croatian action-adventure film directed by Igor Šeregi and a prequel to Metastases (film). It is a dramatisation of the clashes at the 1989 derby between the supporters of Dinamo Zagreb and Red Star Belgrade.
The film stars Rene Bitorajac returning as Krpa along with Marko Janketić, Filip Detelić, Igor Hamer and many others.

Cast 

Rene Bitorajac - Krpa
Matija Kačan - Filip
Marko Cindrić - Kizo
Filip Detelić - Buba
Marko Janketić - Dejo
Domagoj Mrkonjić - Žuti
Nikola Rakočević - Peđa
Miloš Timotijević - Rile
Mijo Jurišić - Ićo
Mario Petrekovic - Zlatkec
Igor Hamer - Roko

References

External links 

2016 action films
Films set in Croatia
Films set in Serbia
Films set in Belgrade
Films set in Yugoslavia
Croatian action films
Films set in 1989
Films shot in Belgrade
2010s Serbian-language films
2010s Croatian-language films
2016 multilingual films
Croatian multilingual films